A President's Counsel (postnominal PC) is an eminent lawyer who is appointed by the President of Sri Lanka as an individual "learned in the law". The term is an honorific that replaced the  Queen's Counsel (QC), which Sri Lanka ceased apponting when it became a republic in 1972. It is equivalent to the appointment of a King's Counsel in the United Kingdom and other Commonwealth realms, and that of Senior Counsel in Commonwealth republics, bearing the same privileges, such as sitting within the Bar of court.

The professional rank of being a President's Counsel is a status conferred by the President under the Article 33 of the Constitution of Sri Lanka. It does not entail the titleholder being employed by the President or state. Appointments are made from lawyers who have practiced as counsel in original and appellate courts for many years either in the official or unofficial bar. Holders of the title of President's Counsel appointed to the judiciary do not lose the title.

Appointment

The appointment is made by the President of Sri Lanka by letters patent, thereafter the appointed President's Counsel takes the oath of office at a ceremonial sitting of the Supreme Court of Sri Lanka at which point the appointee is considered a President's Counsel and are called to the Inner Bar.

Law officers who are public prosecutors of the Attorney General's Department are customarily appointed as President's Counsel after they are promoted to the grade of Additional Solicitor General. These may be singular appointments made several times a year after their promotion. Once in several years, several attorneys from the unofficial bar will be appointed based on recommendations forwarded by the Chief Justice, Attorney General and the President of the Bar Association of Sri Lanka to the President.

History

In 1903, Frederick Dornhorst, Ponnambalam Ramanathan and Thomas De Sampayo were sworn in as the first King's Counsels in the island of Ceylon, which was a British colony at the time. Since then eminent lawyers who were advocates were appointed as King's Counsel until the title changed to Queen's Counsel with the change of monarch in 1952. When Ceylon became a republic in 1972, appointments of QCs was no longer possible and equivalent of "Senior Attorney-at-Law" used.

In 1984 the 8th amendment to the constitution of 1978 granted the President powers to appoint "as President's Counsel, attorneys-at-law who have reached eminence in the profession and have maintained high standards of conduct and professional rectitude." It also grants President's Counsel "all such privileges as were hitherto enjoyed by Queen's Counsel". The holder can use the post-nominal letters PC after his or her name.

Political Controversy in Appointments
The appointments of PC's by various Presidents, in the last few decades has been faced with harsh criticism, hinting at arbitrary political merit over actual seniority. There was a growing concern among the local bar that the President was not appointing senior attorneys as PC's.

Sri Lanka, compared to other commonwealth jurisdictions, does not have a systematic appointment criteria in appointing PC's,  for example; "Queen's Counsels" in England and Wales, Senior counsel in Australia and Singapore, and "Senior Advocates" in India. 

Case in point, under the tenure of President Maithripala Sirisena, controversy arose over the appointments of President's Counsels (PCs), which led to the filing of a FR (Fundamental Rights) Petition by Attorney-at-Law Upul Kumarapperuma at the Supreme Court in 2019, to take action against the unregulated appointments carried out by the President (75 appointments between 2017 and 2019)

These arbitrary appointments were happening, regardless of the fact that, The Bar Association of Sri Lanka (BASL) introduced a set of guidelines for appointing PCs in April 2016, which was based on the constitution's Article 33(2)(e) which states that PCs should be "Attorneys-at-law who have reached eminence in the profession and have maintained high standards of conduct and professional rectitude".

The petition in particular criticised the 2018 PC nominations, called by President Sirisena, and requested there be a new set of criteria for PC applications. The petitioner, raised concerns over the President not following proper criteria and not appointing PCs based on merit.

2021 Amendment to the Criteria
Subsequently, new guidelines were issued in 2021, to regulate the appointment of PC's, aiming towards a more uniform and fair system. On 22 November 2021, the Gazzette was issued by the Secretary to the President, P.B. Jayasundera.

Current Criteria to be Appointed (As of 2021)
As per the new Guidelines, appointments of PC's should be limited to a maximum of 1 batch per year, and The number of PC's appointed per year should not exceed 10.

 To be appointed as a President's Counsel in Sri Lanka, you must be a qualified lawyer registered with the Supreme Court of Sri Lanka.
 You must have reached a high level of eminence and maintained a professional conduct of the highest standard.
 You should have made significant contributions to the legal profession as a subject specialist at a senior level, either in Sri Lanka or internationally, and brought honor to Sri Lanka.
 You must have a good reputation and character, and have been a taxpayer registered with the Department of Inland Revenue for at least 5 years.
 Training several junior lawyers who have made meaningful contributions to the profession, as well as authoring books or publications on law, are also considered as added merits.
 Normally, you must have been an Attorney-at-Law for at least 20 years to be eligible, however in exceptional cases, 15 years may suffice if other criteria are met.
 The President may consult the Chief Justice and the Attorney General before making appointments.

Notable President's Counsels

List of Senior Attorneys-at-Law

In 1984 Senior Attorneys-at-Law were reappointed as PCs.

 H. L. de Silva
 Elmo Nimal Patrick Senanayake

References

 
Ceremonial officers in Sri Lanka